Pouya Dadmarz is an Iranian Greco-Roman wrestler.

in 2021, Dadmarz won a bronze medal in the 55 kg event at Asian Championships and a silver medal in same weight at 2021 Vehbi Emre & Hamit Kaplan Tournament. In 2022, he won gold medal at the 2022 Bolat Turlykhanov Cup held in Almaty, Kazakhstan in  55 kg.

Dadmarz placed eighth at 2022 World Wrestling Championships in category 55 kg.

References

External links 
 
 Pou 
 ya Dadmarz on Instagram 

 

1999 births 
Living people 
People from Izeh 
Iranian male sport wrestlers 
Asian Wrestling Championships medalists 
Sportspeople from Khuzestan province 
21st-century Iranian people